A list of films produced in Egypt in 1991. For an A-Z list of films currently on Wikipedia, see :Category:Egyptian films.

External links
 Egyptian films of 1991 at the Internet Movie Database
 Egyptian films of 1991 elCinema.com

Lists of Egyptian films by year
1991 in Egypt
Lists of 1991 films by country or language